William Scott Home (born January 2, 1940) is the pen name (and, later, legal name) of an American author, poet and biologist principally known for writing horror and dark fantasy. Best known for a short story that appeared in 1978 in The Year's Best Horror Stories (along with Stephen King's "Children of the Corn", which also made the cut that year), Home was most prolific during the 1970s and 80s when his poetry and fiction was published in a wide range of media. Part of a circle of Science Fiction, Fantasy and Horror writers that paid homage to M. P. Shiel and H. P. Lovecraft, Home is considered by many to be a unique talent in his own right. His range of styles and control of language and suspense is well-demonstrated in his published collection: Hollow Faces, Merciless Moons. While he has published little since the 1980s, Home is still writing and currently lives in the Dyea Valley, west of Skagway, Alaska.

Early life 
Home was born in Windsor, Missouri, and grew up in a Protestant family of musicians and Bible scholars. He earned a BA in zoology in 1964 from the University of Minnesota and an MS in zoology in 1982 from the University of Alaska. He taught biology, chemistry, and geography in Belize and the Caribbean before taking a series of government jobs in Alaska.

Writings

Fiction 
At age 17, Home had his first work published in a national magazine. The fantasy piece, published in Sir! under the "True Stories" heading, centered on an imagined visit to a snake handler's ceremony. While he had a number of  mainstream poems printed in "little magazines" during high school years, it was not until the publication of his story, "The Fruits of Yebo's Sins", in Weirdbook in 1971 that he found his niche. Home would publish repeatedly with Weirdbook and its editor/publisher W. Paul Ganley for the next decade.

Soon after his first publication in Weirdbook, other horror fiction-themed magazines began printing his stories as well. In 1972, both his story "Dull Scavengers Wax Crafty" and an essay were published in Meade and Penny Frierson's epochal HPL, a tribute to H. P. Lovecraft. His 1977 Weirdbook story "Deadlier at Hearth than Hunt" was not only published several times in English, but also as an Italian translation (1995).

In 1977 Ganley published a collection of Home's short stories, Hollow Faces, Merciless Moons,  illustrated by fantasy art legend Steven E. Fabian. One story, "A Cobweb of Pulsing Veins", was chosen for The Year's Best Horror Stories, Series VI. In 1986 Home was mentioned twice in The Penguin Encyclopedia of Horror and the Supernatural.

Home's published short fiction includes:

Articles 
In 1976, Home's essay "Eine Kleine Machen-Musik" was published in the Lovecraft fanzine Nyctalops, and in 1983 he contributed "The Rose Beyond the Thunders and the Whirlpools" to A. Reynolds Morse's massive volume Shiel in Diverse Hands: A Collection of Essays on M.P. Shiel. His paper, "The Lovecraft 'Books': Some Addenda and Corrigenda" (originally published in 1966 in August Derleth's The Dark Brotherhood and Other Pieces) was translated into French and published in the prestigious Cahiers L'Herne in 1969. In 1987, Thomas Ligotti included Home's essay "The Horror Theme after H. P. Lovecraft" (first published in HLP) in the Gale Research compilation Twentieth Century Literary Criticism.

Poetry 
Home's poetry appeared regularly in Weirdbook and Ganley's Amanita Brandy (starting with issue No. 1). In the early 1980s, John D. Squires made a photocopy booklet of his own favorites from among Homes's poems, including Onyx and Bloodstone and The Ransom of Enchanted Castles; copies of the informal collection still show up on the book market now and then. In 1985, Randy Everts of The Strange Company published two collections of Home's original verse:  Black Diamond Gates, pieces reflecting the 1200-1600 AD era of magic and experimental science; and Stain of Moonlight, which offers more general poems.

Translations 
French was the first of several languages Home translated into English, beginning with Jose-Maria de Heredia's French sonnets "Fuite de Centaures" ("Flight of the Centaurs"), published in Flame. By the early 1980s, small magazines, such as Nightshade, were publishing Home's translations from French, Spanish and Portuguese.

Scientific Publications 
In addition to his fiction writing, through the 1970s and 1980s, Home produced a large number of biological and anthropological writings, some book-length. His 50-page study, The Chilkoot and Chilkat: A Capsule History, encompassed forty years of research into the Tlinkit history of the Upper Lynn Canal and Glacier Bay in Alaska.

Critical Reviews 
In a 1997 article on what went into creating HPL, Meade Frierson specifically notes Home’s contributions and his "fine article displaying the breadth of his knowledge of the field of weird". Commenting on his later inclusion of Home's article as part of the Lovecraft commentary in the monumental Twentieth Century Literary Criticism series, Ligotti praised it as "lucid and insightful". [15b] On choosing one of Home's stories for The Year's Best Horror Stories, Series VI, editor Gerald W. Page noted that, despite the limited circulation of the small magazines such as Weirdbook, where Home's stories were typically published, Home himself exercised a wide influence on the horror fantasy field.

Reviewers and critics, however, have often shown mixed feelings about Home's writing. Page, in his introduction to The Year's Best Horror Stories, calls Home "a writer who is sometimes difficult, but who is usually vivid and often original."[9b] In 2011, Ligotti named Hollow Faces, Merciless Moons the weirdest piece of fiction he had ever read:
 ... so complex and recondite that it's all but unreadable, much like that of Clark Ashton Smith.  Furthermore, Home's narratives are baffling and sometime barely comprehensible, somewhat in the manner of Robert Aickman. For a while I thought that Home was either an inexpert writer or a mental case. Then I found an essay by him  ... [that] was lucid and insightful.

Kingdom of Redonda 
Home has also made a claim to the throne of the Kingdom of Redonda, taking the name Guillermo I and proclaiming his Thaumaturgical Reincarnate Legitimacy as Shiel's successor. In 1974, Ben Indick, responding to Home's pieces in Frierson's HPL, declared William Scott Home to be the stylistic reincarnation of the writer M. P. Shiel (first King of Redonda), an event recounted by John D. Squires  in his essay on the Redonda Legend.

References

1940 births
American expatriates in Belize
American fantasy writers
American horror writers
American science fiction writers
21st-century American zoologists
Living people
People from the Municipality of Skagway Borough, Alaska
People from Windsor, Missouri
University of Alaska Fairbanks alumni
University of Minnesota College of Biological Sciences alumni
Weird fiction writers
Writers from Alaska
Novelists from Missouri
Micronational leaders